"All Summer Long" is a song by Welsh musician and composer John Cale. It was released as a digital single in August 2013, while on the B-side was the song "Sandman (Flying Dutchman)" from Cale's album Shifty Adventures in Nookie Wood from the previous year. "All Summer Long" was released only on this single, but not on any studio album. It was recorded during the recording sessions for Shifty Adventures in Nookie Wood.

The song was created when Cale was in his New York flat, remembering the summer weather in California.

Track listing
All songs written and composed by John Cale

Personnel
John Cale – vocals, keyboards, synthesizers, bass, acoustic guitar, tambourine, programming, arrangements, producer
Dustin Boyer – electric guitar, programming, recording
Deantoni Parks – drums
Verde Trio – backing vocals, horns
Adam Moseley – mixing
Nita Scott – executive producer

References

John Cale songs
2013 singles
2013 songs
Song recordings produced by John Cale
Songs written by John Cale